Henry Hervey may refer to:

Henry Hervey, 1st Baron Hervey, of the Barons Hervey
Henry Hervie, Archdeacon of Middlesex

See also

Henry Harvey (disambiguation)